Vindsalen is a mountain pass on Svenskøya in Kong Karls Land, Svalbard. It separates the mountain of Mohnhøgda from Dunérfjellet, rather north on the island, not far from the northernmost point Arnesenodden.

References

Mountain passes of Svalbard
Svenskøya